Crash Palace. is an Australian television soap opera. The series ran for 65 half-hour episodes screening on subscription TV channel Fox8. It was also aired in the UK and Ireland on Sky1.

Revolving around a backpacker hostel in Kings Cross, the show followed the trials and tribulations on a group of young travellers from all around the world.

Cast

References

External links 
 

Australian drama television series
Australian television soap operas